Waleed Al-Gizani (وليد الجيزاني in Arabic; born 26 February 1981) is a Saudi football player.

Honours

Club
Al-Hilal
Saudi Crown Prince Cup: 2011

Individual
2009 King Cup of Champions: Top scorers

External links
Goalzz.com Profile
Kooora.com Profile 

1982 births
Living people
Saudi Arabian footballers
Saudi Arabia international footballers
Al-Ahli Saudi FC players
Al-Shabab FC (Riyadh) players
Al-Hazem F.C. players
Al Hilal SFC players
Al-Raed FC players
Al-Shoulla FC players
Al-Orobah FC players
Al-Riyadh SC players
Al-Jabalain FC players
Sportspeople from Jeddah
Saudi First Division League players
Saudi Second Division players
Saudi Professional League players
Association football forwards